The legislative district of Kalinga-Apayao was the representation of the historical province of Kalinga-Apayao in the various national legislatures of the Philippines. Since 1998, the province has been represented in the lower house of the Congress of the Philippines through the separate lone congressional districts of Apayao and Kalinga.

History

Prior to gaining separate representation, areas formerly under the jurisdiction of Kalinga-Apayao were represented under the undivided Mountain Province (1917–1969).

The enactment of Republic Act No. 4695 on 18 June 1966 combined the sub-provinces of Apayao and Kalinga into a full-fledged province named Kalinga-Apayao. The new province began electing its separate representative in 1969.

Kalinga-Apayao was represented as part of Region II from 1978 to 1984, and returned one representative, elected at large, to the Regular Batasang Pambansa in 1984.

Under the new Constitution which was proclaimed on 11 February 1987, the province constituted a lone congressional district, and elected its member to the restored House of Representatives starting that same year.

Apayao and Kalinga became separate provinces following the passage and subsequent ratification of Republic Act No. 7878 on May 8, 1995. The new provinces began electing their separate representatives in the 1998 elections.

Lone District (defunct)

At-Large (defunct)

See also
Legislative district of Apayao
Legislative district of Kalinga
Legislative districts of the Mountain Province

References

Kalinga-Apayao